Mercedes Pulido de Briceño (22 March 1938 – 23 August 2016) was a Venezuelan politician, diplomat and social psychologist. She served as Minister of State for Women's Participation in Development from 1994 to 1996. She was President of the UNICEF Executive Board at the international level in 1997.

References

20th-century Venezuelan women politicians
20th-century Venezuelan politicians
Chairmen and Presidents of UNICEF
1938 births
2016 deaths
Venezuelan women diplomats
Venezuelan officials of the United Nations
Venezuelan women educators
Death in Caracas